Footprints of the Outsider is a novel by Ugandan author Julius Ocwinyo, published by Fountain Publishers in 2002.

Plot
Footprints of the Outsider is set in Teboke Village in the Apac district of Uganda. The only brick structure in the village is the ginnery at Teboke trading centre set up by two Indians, Hippos and Ramchand. It revolves around Abdul Olwit, whose mother, Alicinora is a prostitute. As he grows, Abdul suffers ridicule not only from his peers but from his mother. Despite odds being against him, he graduates from Makerere University with a bachelor's of arts degree in economics, and becomes a teacher.

Abdul, seeking to work in government, goes to Adoli Awal, the Teboke Member of Parliament, for help. But because Adwong, Abdul's uncle is Adoli's political enemy, the latter refuses. Abdul is later arrested when Adoli thinks he is eyeing his parliamentary seat. Abdul is released and contests for the parliamentary seat. The clashes that break out on one of the campaign rallies leave some people hurt and others dead. The book seeks to find the candidate who will become Teboke's next MP.

Awards
The novel won the Kinyara Award for best adult fiction (sponsored by the British Council) in 2004.

References 

2002 novels
Ugandan novels
Postcolonial novels
Novels set in Uganda
Kumusha